Francisco José "Curro" Montoya Gómez (born 13 February 1977) is a Spanish retired footballer who played as a defensive midfielder.

Club career
Montoya was born in Alicante, Valencian Community. After starting his development at Hércules CF he finished it with neighbouring Valencia CF, going on to spend five years with their reserves in the third division. In 2000–01 he made his La Liga debut, appearing rarely for CD Numancia in a relegation-ending season.

Subsequently, Montoya played seven years in the second level, with Real Jaén, Elche CF, Ciudad de Murcia and Granada 74 CF. In his debut campaign at the latter club he suffered a serious injury which sidelined him for several months, as the team suffered relegation.

In 2009–10, Montoya represented Atlético Ciudad and Orihuela CF, both in division three and both undergoing institutional and economic problems. For the following season, he joined CF La Nucía of the fourth tier.

International career
Montoya represented Spain at the 1997 FIFA World Youth Championship in Malaysia, playing four games for the eventual quarter-finalists in a squad which also featured Valencia youth graduates David Albelda, Miguel Ángel Angulo and Javier Farinós.

Honours
Spain U18
UEFA European Under-18 Championship: 1995

References

External links

1977 births
Living people
Footballers from Alicante
Spanish footballers
Association football midfielders
La Liga players
Segunda División players
Segunda División B players
Tercera División players
Valencia CF Mestalla footballers
CD Numancia players
Real Jaén footballers
Elche CF players
Ciudad de Murcia footballers
Granada 74 CF footballers
Orihuela CF players
Spain youth international footballers